Merdeka 118, formerly known as Warisan Merdeka Tower, KL 118 and PNB 118, is a 118-storey megatall skyscraper in Kuala Lumpur, Malaysia.

The building's name, Merdeka (which literally means "independence"), is inspired by its proximity to Stadium Merdeka.

It is the tallest building in Malaysia and Southeast Asia. The building will also be the first in Malaysia to receive a triple platinum rating from worldwide sustainability certifications, including Leadership in Energy and Environmental Design (LEED).

Background 
The Merdeka 118 (the whole precinct's) development is a 19-acre land funded by Permodalan Nasional Berhad (PNB), with a budget of RM5 billion (US$ billion). When completed in 2023, the tower will be the tallest building in Malaysia.

The building will consist of 100 stories of rentable space, including 83 stories of office space, 12 stories of hotel rooms, 5 stories of hotel residences, and an observatory floor which will be the highest observation deck in Southeast Asia. It has two observation decks, the first inside the building and the second inside the spire, and a retail business center (118 Mall). It will be surrounded by four acres of urban and linear parks. The non-rentable space consists of elevators, recreational and maintenance facilities, as well as parking spaces for up to 8,500 cars. 60 out of the 80 stories of office space will be reserved for Permodalan Nasional Berhad (PNB), the developer of the project, and its subsidiaries.

Site 
The building is situated on Petaling Hill, on the location of the former Merdeka Park (subsequently repurposed into an open-air car park). The site lies within the vicinity of landmarks such as Petaling Street, sporting venues including Merdeka Stadium, Stadium Negara and the Chin Woo Stadium, three schools (the Victoria Institution, the Methodist Boys' School and the Chinese-type Jalan Davidson Primary School), and the stalled Plaza Rakyat project (across the Ampang Line). The Merdeka 118 development, when completed, will also have access to the newly built Merdeka MRT Station on the Kajang Line (SBK) and be directly linked from three major roads via the Belfield Tunnel, which will be a 2-storey underground tunnel passing underneath Kampung Attap and Jalan Maharajalela to the basement of the precinct.

Design 

The building is designed with a mixture of diamond-shaped glass facades to signify the diversity of Malaysians. The design was made to resemble and inspired by Tunku Abdul Rahman's outstretched hand gesture while chanting "Merdeka!", when he proclaimed the independence of Malaysia on 31 August 1957. The building's cladding will comprise 18,144 panels, 114,000 square-meter of glass, and 1,600 tonnes of window frame extrusions. It will contain the 118 Mall, Grade-A offices, hotels, and residential areas. The structural engineers are Leslie E. Robertson Associates and Robert Bird Group while the civil and structural engineer of record for this tower is Arup. The building will be equipped and illuminated at night with 8.4  km of LED light strips which would gradually move from one corner to another. The Neapoli Group, an environmental design and engineering firm, was employed to provide consultancy services towards achieving platinum rating with three Green Building certification bodies: Leadership in Energy and Environmental Design (LEED), Green Building Index and GreenRE.

Floor plans 

All of the floor plans were obtained from the building's proposals and are subject to change.

Height 

The height of the spire, crown, roof, top floor, observation and residential towers of Merdeka 118.

Progress 
The piling and foundation work for the project was awarded to Pintaras Geotechnics Sdn Bhd. The Permodalan Nasional Berhad shortlisted six groups for various construction jobs: Samsung C&T and UEM Group Bhd; IJM Corp Bhd, Norwest Holdings Sdn Bhd, and Shimizu Corp; Malaysian Resources Corp Bhd and State Construction Engineering Corp; WCT Bhd and Arabtec Construction LLC; TSR Capital Bhd and Daewoo Group; Seacera Group Bhd with Spaz Sdn Bhd, Sinohydro Corp, and Shanghai Construction Group. These companies submitted their bids by January 28, 2015. KONE, a Finnish group, is supplying around 87 elevators and escalators for the project.

On 23 November 2015, PNB announced a contract worth RM3.4 billion has been awarded to the joint venture of South Korea's Samsung C&T and UEM Group Berhad. Furthermore, on 9 November 2017, PNB planned to raise up to RM5 billion fund for its project via a green sukuk, the Merdeka Asean Green SRI Sukuk, with a 15-year tenure. The sukuk covered the development of its 83-storey office space, which forms part of the tower. It is the first adopter of the Asean Green Bond Standards launched by the Securities Commission Malaysia that validates PNB commitment to develop the project as a sustainable and environmentally-friendly project.

On 27 February 2018, it was announced that Park Hyatt will open up a hotel in Merdeka 118. The Park Hyatt Kuala Lumpur will occupy the top 17 floors of the building; It is slated to have 232 units, including 28 suites and 30 apartments.

The construction was halted on 18 March 2020 due to the Movement Control Order in Malaysia caused by the COVID-19 pandemic in the country, but works resumed in mid-May 2020. In early August 2020, the building's concrete core topped out at 118 floors surpassing the Vincom Landmark 81 as the tallest building in Southeast Asia. On 25 October 2020, PNB president, Ahmad Zulqarnain Onn, announced that Phases 1 and 2 are expected to be finished in 2022 Q3. Phase 3 is expected to be completed in 2024 or 2025. The construction is currently in Phase 1, which focuses on the tower.

As of 8 June 2021, the tower was at 81% completion, with the installation of the glass façade in progress at Level 108 and has successfully reached Level 118 with its spire already 50% assembled along with the retail podium. Turner International plays the role of Project Management Consultant for this complex development. The tower was topped out in November 2021.

Criticism

Practicality of the structure
Many Malaysians have criticized this project, adding that it is unnecessary and a waste of "public funds", having been funded by the Permodalan Nasional Berhad (PNB), a state-owned enterprise of the Malaysian government. Amounting to more than RM5 billion, it is said that the money could have been better used for other practical causes, such as education and healthcare, which has been increasingly deteriorating in the country. In response to the criticism, former Prime Minister Najib Razak, who would eventually be directly involved with the 1MDB scandal, claimed that the project was not a waste and it would "bring more benefits" by generating "economic opportunities".

Trespassing incidents
In 2022, a viral video began circulating online when a group of American individuals trespassed towards the top of Merdeka 118, prompting criticism of the lack of security measures at the site. In a statement, the developer stated that such stunts are illegal and that trespassing is illegal by law. The group was eventually charged under Section 457 of the Malaysian Penal Code.

That same year, another trespassing incident occurred when Russian rooftoppers Angela Nikolau and Ivan Beerkus scaled the spire of Merdeka 118, prompting further criticism. Malaysian police requested for the entry and exit records of the couple from the Immigration Department, which responded that there is no records of the duo entering or exiting Malaysia, suggesting that they had entered the country illegally. Home Minister Saifuddin Nasution Ismail has confirmed that a full investigation is ongoing.

Transportation

The building will be served by the Kajang Line's Merdeka MRT station located along Jalan Hang Jebat, which is connected to an interchange with the Ampang/Sri Petaling Line's Plaza Rakyat LRT station.

It will also be accessible from the Maharajalela Monorail station connected through the precinct's linear park under the development.

The Hang Tuah station, serving both the Ampang Line and KL Monorail, is a 600-metre walk southeast.

Gallery

See also

 Bandar Malaysia
List of buildings with 100 floors or more
List of tallest buildings
List of tallest buildings in Asia
 List of tallest buildings in Kuala Lumpur
List of tallest buildings in Malaysia
List of tallest structures
Malaysian National Projects
Petronas Twin Towers
Tower M
Tradewinds Square Tower
Tun Razak Exchange (TRX)

References

Buildings and structures under construction in Malaysia
Postmodern architecture in Malaysia
Residential skyscrapers in Malaysia
Skyscraper hotels in Kuala Lumpur
Skyscraper office buildings in Kuala Lumpur
Skyscrapers in Kuala Lumpur